The 1974 NAIA Soccer Championship was the 16th annual tournament held by the NAIA to determine the national champion of men's college soccer among its members in the United States.

Defending champions Quincy (IL) defeated Davis & Elkins in the final, 6–0, to claim the Hawks' fifth NAIA national title. This was a rematch of the 1968, 1970, and 1971 championships.

The final was  played in Florissant, Missouri.

Qualification

For the fourth year, the tournament field remained fixed at eight teams. Unlike the previous three years, however, additional fifth- and seventh-place finals were not contested.

Bracket

See also  
 1974 NCAA Division I Soccer Tournament
 1974 NCAA Division II Soccer Championship
 1974 NCAA Division III Soccer Championship

References 

NAIA championships
NAIA
1974 in sports in Missouri